Graber is a coachbuilder based in Wichtrach in central Switzerland.

Graber or Gräber may also refer to:

People
Anthony Graber, American cleared of charges of violation of Maryland wiretapping law
Bill Graber, American pole vaulter
Bill Graber, founder of the Lez Get Real website
Christoph Beat Graber, Swiss academic
Doug Graber, former American football coach
Erich Graber, Italian luger
Fred A. Graber (1895–1950), New York politician
George Alexander Graber, who wrote under the name Alexander Cordell
Giovanni Graber, Italian luger
Juston R. Graber, specialist involved in Operation Iron Triangle
Manfred Gräber, Italian luger
Pierre Graber, Swiss politician and member of the Swiss Federal Council
Richard Graber, American lawyer  
Rod Graber, former Major League Baseball center fielder
S. Graber, Italian luger
Sheila Graber, British animator
Susan P. Graber, American attorney and jurist
Ted Graber, American interior designer
Travis Graber, American football coach 
Vincent J. Graber, Sr. (1931–2014), member of the New York State Assembly
Vitus Graber or Veit Graber (1844–1892), Austrian zoologist

Other uses
Graber Olive House
House at 1648 Riverside Drive, also known as the Graber Residence